The Taphrinaceae are a family of fungi in the order Taphrinales. According to a 2008 estimate, the family contains 2 genera and 118 species.

References

Taphrinomycetes
Ascomycota families